U 755 is the Rundata designation for a Viking Age memorial runestone located in Kälsta, Uppland, Sweden.

Description
This runestone was first documented by Richard Dybeck, who is known as the author of the lyrics to the Swedish national anthem, in 1860: "The runestone stands between Litslena and Herkeberga Church, so close to the edge of the road by Kalstad - part of the lower inscription has been damaged."

The cross on the stone indicates that Ágautr was a Christian. The name Ágautr does not appear in any other material (either other rune inscriptions or middle age sources). Lidhsmadhr is also an unusual name, there is however a mention on another runestone in nearby Simtuna with this name, on inscription U 1160, which possibly could reference the same person.

The place name Kelsstaðir in the runic text, sometimes read as Kal-taþum, refers to the modern hamlet of Kälsta.

Inscription
A transliteration of the runic inscription is:
+ lis(m)[a]--... auk + tuki + rastu × stain + (þ)i(n)a + aftir + akaut + bu(k)i + i + k[a](l)[staþ](u)m

References

Uppland Runic Inscription 0755